Pete Angelus is an artist manager who has worked in the music business since 1975.  During his career, he has worked with Van Halen, Jimmy Page of Led Zeppelin, Slash, Hall & Oates and has managed The Black Crowes since the release of their 1989 multi-platinum debut album, 'Shake Your Money Maker.'

Early years
He first made his name in the business when he designed and directed a light show for Van Halen in 1980 for their first world tour as a headline act, which at the time was the most elaborate music light show ever designed and implemented, requiring 7 tractor-trailers for the lights alone.  In addition to light and stage design, Angelus forayed into art direction for the band, influencing Van Halen's logo and early album covers, as well as designing much of the band's merchandise from 1979 to their breakup with Roth in 1985.  Angelus became such a creative influence the members of the band, Eddie Van Halen, Alex Van Halen, David Lee Roth, and Michael Anthony referred to him as "the fifth member of Van Halen."  Many of David Lee Roth's quips came from the tongue of Angelus (Note the opening of California Girls:  "Thank Heaven for Little Girls, Maurice Chevalier, 1958" "And some of the other sizes, too  Pete and Dave, 1985"). Roth, with whom Angelus had a falling out after managing his solo career for six years, failed to acknowledge Angelus' work and partnership in his memoir.

As MTV became all the rage, his interest turned to video production, and he went on to direct some of the most well-known and most-played music videos of all-time. Five times, the videos he directed were nominated for MTV "Video of the Year" status.

Music videos
Angelus is credited with writing and directing the following videos:
 			
Jump / Van Halen (1984)	
VH1 Top 100 Videos Of All Time
MTV Greatest Music Videos Ever Made

Hot for Teacher / Van Halen (1984) 	
VH1 Video Hall of Fame 2002
VH1 Top 20 Funniest Videos Ever Made	
VH1 Top 100 Videos Of All Time
Playboy’s Top 15 Sexiest Videos of All Time
			
Just a Gigolo / David Lee Roth (1985)
MTV Greatest Music Videos Ever Made
VH1 Top 20 Funniest Videos Ever Made
	
California Girls / David Lee Roth	(1985) 
VH1 Top 100 Videos Of All Time
MTV Top 5 "Babe" Videos of All Time

Angelus also directed the following videos for The Black Crowes:
Jealous Again
Twice as Hard
Hard to Handle (co-directed by Tom Trbovich)
She Talks to Angels
Thorn in My Pride
Remedy

Angelus also made cameos in David Lee Roth's "Just a Gigolo," "Yankee Rose," and "Goin' Crazy!" videos.

As a manager
He worked with such well-known label presidents as David Geffen, Tommy Mottola, Don Ienner, Rick Rubin, Mo Ostin and Clive Davis.

He was instrumental in creating the “Jimmy Page/ The Black Crowes: Live From The Greek” record and the “Tour of Brotherly Love” with The Black Crowes and Oasis.

Angelus’ business distinction is equally as strong as his creative reputation.  Billboard Magazine referred to him as a “visionary.”  A feature in The Album Network commented, “Angelus is a magician when it comes to artist development and the media…his creativity and success warrant the status he has earned as a legendary manager.”

INTERVIEW 1

INTERVIEW 2

BOOK MENTIONS 1

BOOK MENTIONS 2

References

Year of birth missing (living people)
Living people
American music managers
American music video directors
Place of birth missing (living people)